Jerry Belson (July 8, 1938 – October 10, 2006) was a writer, director, and producer of Hollywood films for over 40 years.

Career
Belson's writing credits include the Steven Spielberg films Always and Close Encounters of the Third Kind, several episodes of The Dick Van Dyke Show; Gomer Pyle, U.S.M.C., and I Spy. During the early 1960s, concurrent with contributing scripts for TV sitcoms with then writing partner Garry Marshall, Belson contributed stories for Gold Key Comics. He also helped produce The Drew Carey Show, The Norm Show, and The Tracey Ullman Show.

In the TV Land 2006 documentary The 100 Greatest TV Quotes and Catchphrases, Lowell Ganz credits Belson with including in the script of the season 3 Odd Couple episode "My Strife in Court" (originally aired Friday, February 16, 1973) the catchphrase "Never ASSUME, because when you ASSUME, you make an ASS of U and ME." Ganz noted that Belson had heard it used years ago by a teacher in a typewriter repair class.

He won three Emmy Awards: two for The Tracey Ullman Show in 1989 and 1990, and one for Tracey Takes On... in 1997.

Death
Belson died of cancer on October 10, 2006 at his home in Los Angeles.
His sister, screenwriter Monica Johnson, died on November 1, 2010.

Television credits 

The Dick Van Dyke Show (1961–1966)
Bob Hope Presents The Chrysler Theater (1964)
Gomer Pyle U.S.M.C. (1964–1969)
I Spy (1965–1968)
Hey Landlord! (1966–1967)
Sheriff Who? (pilot) (1967)
Love, American Style (1969–1974)
The Murdocks and the McClays (1970)
Barefoot in the Park (1970)
The Odd Couple (1970–1975)
Evil Roy Slade (1972)
Cops (1973)
Mixed Nuts (pilot) (with Michael J. Leeson) (1977)
Young Guy Christian (pilot) (with Michael J. Leeson) (1979)
The Tracey Ullman Show (1987–1990)
Tracey Takes On... (1996–1999)
The Drew Carey Show (consulting producer) (1995–2004)
The Norm Show (consulting producer) (1999–2001)

Film credits 

How Sweet It Is! (1968) (with Garry Marshall)
The Grasshopper (1970)
Smile (1975)
Fun with Dick and Jane (with David Giler and Mordecai Richler) (1977)
Close Encounters of the Third Kind (1977) (uncredited)
The End (1978)
Smokey and the Bandit II (with Brock Yates) (1980)
Student Bodies (1981) (executive producer)
Jekyll and Hyde... Together Again (with Monica Johnson, Harvey Miller and Michael J. Leeson) (1982)
Surrender (1987)
Always (1989)

Theater credits 

The Roast (1980, with Garry Marshall)
Smile (1986, adapted from the screenplay)

References

External links
 
 

1938 births
2006 deaths
Deaths from prostate cancer
American male screenwriters
American television directors
American television writers
Deaths from cancer in California
Emmy Award winners
Film directors from California
People from El Centro, California
Screenwriters from California
American male television writers
20th-century American male writers
20th-century American screenwriters